The Water Polo Tournament at the 1991 Pan American Games only had a men's competition in Havana, Cuba. The tournament was held from August 6 to August 13.

Men's competition

Teams

GROUP A

GROUP B

Preliminary round

GROUP A

1991-08-06

1991-08-07

1991-08-08

1991-08-10

GROUP B

1991-08-06

1991-08-07

1991-08-08

1991-08-10

Semi Final Round
1991-08-12 — 5th/8th place

1991-08-12 — 1st/4th place

Final round
1991-08-13 — 7th place

1991-08-13 — 5th place

1991-08-13 — Bronze-medal match

1991-08-13 — Gold-medal match

Final ranking

References
Sports123
Results

Events at the 1991 Pan American Games
P
1991
1991